The FIS Team Tour 2010 was a team competition that took place at Oberstdorf, Klingenthal and Willingen located in Germany, between 30 January and 7 February 2010.

Results

Overall

References

External links 
  

FIS Team Tour
2010 in ski jumping
2010 in German sport
FIS
FIS